The BL 9.2-inch Mark XI gun was a British 50 calibre high-velocity naval gun which was mounted as primary armament on armoured cruisers and secondary armament on pre-dreadnought battleships.

History 
The gun with its increased length of 50 calibres was an attempt to extract a higher velocity, and hence more range and armour-piercing capability, from the 9.2-inch gun. Like other British 50-calibre guns of the period, it was relatively unsuccessful and was the last model of 9.2-inch gun Britain built.

Guns were mounted in the following ships :
 Minotaur-class armoured cruisers laid down 1905 & completed 1908–1909: 2 twin mounts.
 Lord Nelson-class battleships laid down 1905 & completed 1908: 4 twin mounts and 2 single mounts.

After the scrapping of these ships, these guns and mountings were retained in storage. There was the intention, at one point, early during World War Two, to use them as armament for small monitors which would have been reduced versions of the Roberts-class monitors; this however never advanced beyond the planning stage.

See also 
 List of naval guns

Notes

References

Bibliography 
The National Archives of the United Kingdom, Kew. SUPP 6/61

External links 

 Tony DiGiulian, British 9.2"/50 (23.4 cm) Mark XI

Naval guns of the United Kingdom
World War I naval weapons of the United Kingdom
234 mm artillery